Anjana Seth is one of the famous fashion designer from New Delhi, India. She designs for both men and women.

Early life
Anjana Seth was born in Orissa and graduated from International Institute of Fashion Technology.

Career
Anjana started her career in New Delhi in 2007, and started her own first independent collection in 2011.

Her label "BARBARIKA" is about promoting India's dying art and crafts and handloom fabrics in the form of garments with an effort to make it relevant to the modern world. Her Lakme Fashion week Summer/Resort 2012 collection "Circle of life" is a tribute to India's "Saura Tribe" each garment depicting a different phase life, birth, death, etc.
The highlights being there paintings, the entire collection is in handloom fabric.

Delhi based Anjana Seth young & dynamic designer participate in Lakme fashion  week, She  presented tribal theme collection which was so realistic and appealing that one can  feel the real India on the ramp, the color, fabrics, cuts were very realistic & mesmerizing.  Fashion designer Umair zafar was impressed to see her collection & supported her during the show.

Her collection which is famous for its handicrafts and stirred fond memories of old, regal India. Indian handloom fabrics such as tussar silk and khadi enveloped softly structured asymmetrically cut silhouettes, which seemed to flare out, with the concept of merging an Indian art form with modern concepts. 
The collection consisted of dresses, gowns, skirts, pants as well as ethnic dresses. The colour palette comprised mainly earthy hues such as beige, off white, cream as well as a few dark tones like blue, grey, deep purple, and black for the adventurous buyer.

Anjana Seth took her creativity up a notch by using custom made beads as embellishments, and then added the gorgeous Zardozi work embroidery which gave just the right touch of glitz, while puffed shoulders and tunic dresses presented a slight androgynous touch. 
Subtle textures and piping on the pieces had a charm of their own; being perfect for those who aren't too bold but don't want to cut back on style. Truly spellbinding, this collection by Anjana Seth had everything that a fashionista could dream of.

References

External links 
http://www.bharattextile.com/features/lakme-fashion-week/2012/summer-resort/profiles/anjana-seth.html
http://businessofcinema.com/ytvideos/anjana-seth-lfw-summerresort-2012-2
http://www.mastione.com/babarika-by-anjana-seth-was-a-colourful-collection-at-the-talent-box-lakme-fashion-week-2012-day-3/
https://web.archive.org/web/20121029082045/http://www.lakmefashionweek.co.in/LFW-March2012/?main_page=designers&did=103
https://web.archive.org/web/20140302024941/http://dumkhum.com/2012/03/05/anjana-seth-at-lakme-fashion-week-with-models/
https://web.archive.org/web/20120827010419/http://harileinsabarwal.com/lfw-summerresort-2012-trends-fluid-talent-box-anjana-seths-barbarika
http://moda.laverdad.es/pasarelas/primavera-verano/2012/semana-de-la-moda-de-lakme-2012/anjana-seth/foto3.html

Indian women fashion designers
Living people
Businesswomen from Odisha
Year of birth missing (living people)